Winston Hsiao-tzu Chang (1 March 1942 – 24 February 1996) was a president of Soochow University in Taipei.

Biography
He and his identical twin brother, John Chang, were born the sons of Chiang Ching-kuo and Chang Ya-juo maybe at what is now Second People's Hospital in  Guilin. As they were born out of wedlock, they took their mother's surname (although both were given the generation name of Hsiao shared by all of Chiang Ching-kuo's children, legitimate or otherwise). Chang Ya-juo died when the brothers were infants in August 1942, and they were raised by Chang Ya-juo's younger brother, Chang Hau-juo (章浩若) and his wife Chi Chen (紀琛). Their uncle and aunt were listed as their parents on official documents until December 2002.

The brothers fled to Hsinchu, Taiwan in 1949 and both studied law in Soochow University. Winston Chang received his master's from Southern Methodist University, and his doctorate from Tulane University Law School. After returning to Taiwan, he was mostly involved in teaching and research. He later became the chairman of the Soochow University College of Law as well as the president in 1992.

On 20 August 1993, Chang visited his mother's tomb in Guilin and attended a cross-straits Buddhist conference. In late 1994, Chang suffered a stroke (eventually causing his death) in Beijing and entered into a coma .  He was flown back to Taiwan via Hong Kong in his comatose condition.  Despite the fact that he never recovered from the coma, he continued to officially serve as president on medical leave until his death two years later.

With Chao Chung-te (趙申德), Chang had a son, Ching-sung (勁松), and a daughter, Yu-chu (友菊).

References

External links
 Soochow University biography

1941 births
1996 deaths
Chiang Kai-shek family
Taiwanese educators
Presidents of universities and colleges in Taiwan
Educators from Guangxi
Tulane University Law School alumni
Southern Methodist University alumni
Soochow University (Taiwan) alumni
Academic staff of Soochow University (Taiwan)
People from Guilin
Taiwanese twins
Identical twins
Chinese Civil War refugees
Taiwanese people from Guangxi